The North Para River is a river located in the Barossa Valley of the Australian state of South Australia.

The river's name is based directly on the Kaurna word pari which means river. The "north" descriptor distinguishes it from the South Para River with which it merges.

Course and features
The North Para River rises in the Barossa Ranges near Eden Valley and follows a meandering path through the Barossa Valley, firstly north to the east of Angaston, then arcs around to the southwest to pass through the towns of Nuriootpa and  Tanunda, before merging with the South Para River in Gawler forming the Gawler River. The river descends  over its  course.

The North Para River catchment is one of the key watersheds in the northern Mount Lofty Ranges. It plays a very important role in the economy of South Australia, providing much of the water used by viticulture in the Barossa Valley. Its waters are also used for livestock production, cereal cropping and recreation.

See also

 Hundred of Nuriootpa
 Hundred of Barossa

References

Rivers of South Australia
Barossa Valley